The 2004 Argentina rugby union tour was a series of matches played in June 2004 in New Zealand, and in November 2004 in France and Ireland by Argentina national rugby union team.

In New Zealand

New Zealand: 15. Nick Evans, 14. Mils Muliaina, 13. Tana Umaga (c), 12. Sam Tuitupou, 11. Joe Rokocoko, 10. Andrew Mehrtens, 9. Byron Kelleher, 8. Mose Tuiali'i, 7. Richie McCaw, 6. Jerry Collins, 5. Simon Maling, 4. Chris Jack, 3. Greg Somerville, 2. Andrew Hore, 1. Tony Woodcock, – Replacements: 18. Jono Gibbes, 19. Marty Holah – Unused : 16. Keven Mealamu, 17. Kees Meeuws, 20. Justin Marshall, 21. Carlos Spencer, 22. Dan Carter
Argentina: 15. Hernán Senillosa, 14. Lucas Borges, 13. Federico Martín Aramburú, 12. Manuel Contepomi, 11. Pablo Gómez Cora, 10. Juan Fernández Miranda, 9. Nicolás Fernández Miranda, 8. Gonzalo Longo (c), 7. Lucas Ostiglia, 6. Martín Durand, 5. Patricio Albacete, 4. Carlos Ignacio Fernández Lobbe, 3. Omar Hasan, 2. Mario Ledesma, 1. Rodrigo Roncero, – Replacements: 16. Federico Méndez, 18. Pablo Bouza, 19. Martín Schusterman – Unused: 17. Eusebio Guiñazú, 20. Matías Albina, 21. Germán Bustos, 22. Francisco Bosch

In France and Ireland 

France: 15. Nicolas Brusque, 14. Aurélien Rougerie, 13. Tony Marsh, 12. Yannick Jauzion, 11. Cédric Heymans, 10. Frédéric Michalak, 9. Jean-Baptiste Élissalde, 8. Imanol Harinordoquy, 7. Olivier Magne, 6. Serge Betsen, 5. Jérôme Thion, 4. Fabien Pelous (c), 3. Sylvain Marconnet, 2. William Servat, 1. Olivier Milloud, – Replacements: 20. Julien Peyrelongue, 21. Clément Poitrenaud – Unused : 16. Sébastien Bruno, 17. Nicolas Mas, 18. Pascal Papé, 19. Julien Bonnaire, 22. Jimmy Marlu
Argentina: 15. Juan Martín Hernández, 14. Lucas Borges, 13. Federico Martín Aramburú, 12. Manuel Contepomi, 11. Hernán Senillosa, 10. Felipe Contepomi, 9. Agustín Pichot (c), 8. Gonzalo Longo, 7. Lucas Ostiglia, 6. Martín Durand, 5. Rimas Álvarez Kairelis, 4. Patricio Albacete, 3. Omar Hasan, 2. Mario Ledesma, 1. Rodrigo Roncero, – Replacements: 19. Martín Schusterman – Unused: 16. Federico Méndez, 17. Eusebio Guiñazú, 18. Pablo Bouza, 20. Nicolás Fernández Miranda

Ireland: 15. Girvan Dempsey, 14. Geordan Murphy, 13. Brian O'Driscoll (c), 12. Shane Horgan, 11. Denis Hickie, 10. Ronan O'Gara, 9. Peter Stringer, 8. Anthony Foley, 7. Johnny O'Connor, 6. Simon Easterby, 5. Paul O'Connell, 4. Malcolm O'Kelly, 3. John Hayes, 2. Shane Byrne, 1. Reggie Corrigan, – Replacements: 19. Eric Miller – Unused: 16. Frankie Sheahan, 17. Marcus Horan, 18. Donncha O'Callaghan, 20. Guy Easterby, 21. David Humphreys, 22. Kevin Maggs
Argentina: 15. Juan Martín Hernández, 14. Hernán Senillosa, 13. Federico Martín Aramburú, 12. Manuel Contepomi, 11. Lucas Borges, 10. Felipe Contepomi, 9. Agustín Pichot (c), 8. Gonzalo Longo, 7. Lucas Ostiglia, 6. Martín Durand, 5. Rimas Álvarez Kairelis, 4. Patricio Albacete, 3. Omar Hasan, 2. Mario Ledesma, 1. Rodrigo Roncero, – Replacements: Unused: 16. Federico Méndez, 17. Eusebio Guiñazú, 18. Pablo Bouza, 19. Augusto Petrilli

References
 Memorias de la UAR 2004 (Archived 2 July 2013)
 
 

2004 rugby union tours
tour
2004
2004 in New Zealand rugby union
2004–05 in European rugby union
2004–05 in French rugby union
2004–05 in Irish rugby union
2004
2004
2004
History of rugby union matches between Argentina and Ireland